Sang Monastery is a Buddhist monastery in Sikkim, northeastern India.
Sang Monastery, the Karma Dubgyu Chokhorling Monastery, was built in 1912 AD. The Monastery belongs to Kagyupa sect of Vajrayana Buddhism
 The Monastery houses two flat stone prints, each bearing one footprint and a hand print of Phaya lama. He was a prominent lama from Tibet who stayed in this Gompa for few years. 
The Lama spent time meditating in a cave situated at a ravine, nearby.

See also 
Buddhism
Gautama Buddha
History of Buddhism in India
Buddhist pilgrimage sites in India

References

External links 
 Buddhist pilgrimage sites in India
 Pilgrims Guide to Buddhist India: Buddhist Sites

Buddhist monasteries in Sikkim
Tibetan Buddhist monasteries